Frederico Gil was the defending champion but lost in the second round to Andreas Haider-Maurer.
Fabio Fognini won this tournament, after Boris Pašanski´s retirement in the final, when the result was 6–4, 4–2 for the Italian player.

Seeds

Draw

Finals

Top half

Bottom half

References
Main Draw
Qualifying Singles

Tennislife Cup - Singles
Tennislife Cup